Rakovnik pri Birčni Vasi is a small settlement in the hills south of Novo Mesto in southeastern Slovenia. The area is part of the traditional region of Lower Carniola and is now included in the Southeast Slovenia Statistical Region.

Name
The name of the settlement was changed from Rakovnik to Rakovnik pri Birčni vasi in 1953.

References

External links
Rakovnik pri Birčni Vasi on Geopedia

Populated places in the City Municipality of Novo Mesto